John Paterson Sinclair (2 December 1945 – 30 May 2015), better known as Jake D'Arcy, was a Scottish actor. He appeared in a number of television series, including as "Pete the Jakey" in the comedy programme Still Game from 2002 until 2007, and as 'Fud' O'Donnell in the 1987 Tutti Frutti.  In films he played Coach Phil Menzies in Gregory's Girl (1981).

Television and Film
Starting in the early 1970s, D'Arcy had roles in films and television, appearing in such TV dramas and films as Dr. Finlay's Casebook, Minder, Tutti Frutti, Rab C. Nesbitt, Takin' Over the Asylum, Hamish Macbeth, Taggart and Still Game. He appeared in the 2009 Christmas special of British comedy show Outnumbered.

D'Arcy also had a brief guest appearance as Archie Gordon, the Father of the Samantha Womack character Antonia "Toni" Gordon in the popular CITV show Spatz in 1990. (Series 1, Episode 2).

In 2014, he played Smokey in the film What We Did on Our Holiday''.

Filmography

Death
D'Arcy died in May 2015 in Glasgow at the age of 69.

References

External links

1945 births
2015 deaths
Scottish male film actors
Scottish male television actors